Tulbaghia simmleri, variously called pink agapanthus, fragrant tulbaghia, and sweet wild garlic (a name it shares with Tulbaghia natalensis), is a species of flowering plant in the family Amaryllidaceae, native to the Northern Provinces of South Africa. It has gained the Royal Horticultural Society's Award of Garden Merit as an ornamental.

References

Allioideae
Endemic flora of South Africa
Flora of the Northern Provinces
Plants described in 1909